{{Infobox university 
| name                    = AMA University
| native_name             = Pamantasang AMA
| image                   = AMA University.svg
| image_size              = 200px
| former_names            = AMA Institute of Computer Studies (1980-2001) AMA Computer College
| campus                  = Urban Main Campus:  Quezon City Metro Manila
| motto                   = {{bulleted list|Never Rest On One's Laurels|QualITy education that works!"}}
| type                    = Private, Nonsectarian, For-profit higher education institution
| established             = 
| founder                 = Dr. Amable R. Aguiluz V
| academic_affiliations   = Philippine Association of Colleges and Universities (PACU) Accreditation Board for Engineering and Technology (ABET)
| chairman              = Dr. Amable R. Aguiluz V
| president             = Amable C. Aguiluz IX
| undergrad             = Approx. 150,000 (entire AMA Education System)
| city                  = Maxima St., Villa Arca Subdivision Project 8, Quezon City
| province              = Metro Manila
| country               = Philippines
| pushpin_map           = Manila
| coordinates           = 
| free_label            = Alma Mater song
| free                  = The AMA Hymn
| colors                = Crimson red  and White 
| nickname              = 
| sporting_affiliations = NAASCU
| mascot                = Titans
| website               = www.ama.edu.ph
}}

AMA Computer University, also known as AMA University or simply AMA, is a private, nonsectarian, for-profit university in Quezon City, Philippines.

History
AMA Institute of Computer Studies
AMA University and its sister school AMA Computer College (AMACC) were founded by Amable R. Aguiluz V, who named them after the initials of his father's name, Amable Mendoza Aguiluz Sr.

Aguiluz founded the AMA Institute of Computer Studies with the first computer school located along Shaw Boulevard on 20 October 1980. Back then, AMA Institute of Computer Studies offered only short-term courses in Electronic Data Processing Fundamentals, Basic Programming, and Technology Career. Three students enrolled at the AMA Institute of Computer Studies during the first semester.

AMA Computer College, branches and sister schools

AMA Computer College was created in June 1981. It extended its services through a four-year Bachelor of Science degree program in Computer Science. With only a handful of students in its first year of operation, the AMACC student population rose from 600 in 1983 to 2,000 in 1985 on its first official campus in Makati. Shortly after, it established its main campus in Quezon City. Two provincial campuses were then founded in Cebu City and Davao City.

The AMA Computer Learning Center (ACLC) was established in 1987 and the AMA Telecommunication & Electronic Learning Center in 1996. The former offers short-course programs for professionals and two-year technical/vocational courses for those who wish to acquire employment skills. The latter concentrates on telecommunication, electronics, and related technologies.

Elevation to university
AMA Computer College of Quezon City became AMA Computer University or AMA University following the conferment of university status by the Philippine government's Commission on Higher Education (CHED) on 20 August 2001.

In 2003, AMA Computer University partnered with Carnegie Mellon University's iCarnegie'' to use its curriculum and courses through e-learning. Previously, iCarnegie had approached STI for the agreement, but opted to stick with AMACU instead.

Overseas AMA Computer College campuses
In 2003, AMA Education system brokered a partnership with the government of Bahrain to establish the AMA International University in Manama.

Athletic programs
In 2001, AMA joined the newly created National Athletic Association of Schools, Colleges and Universities (NAASCU).

Political affiliations
Amable Aguiluz V was Joseph Estrada's political endorser in the 1998 Presidential elections. Aguiluz resigned from the Commission in November 1999 due to a controversial purchase of equipment by the commission from a subsidiary of the AMA Group of Companies.

Aguiluz's father Amable Aguiluz Sr. was Diosdado Macapagal's friend and Aguiluz Sr. served as chairman and auditor-general of the Commission on Audit in the 1960s. Gloria Macapagal Arroyo was invited to AMA's sponsored political rallies. In 1995, Arroyo attended a political rally in AMA when she ran for re-election as senator. Arroyo attended all graduation rites for AMA from 2002 to 2005. Arroyo cited AMA for not participating in cause oriented and student activist groups. Arroyo appointed Aguiluz as Presidential Adviser for the Middle East.

Programs

Colleges

College of Computer Studies
College of Engineering
College of Business Administration and Accountancy
College of Arts and Sciences
College of Education

Branches
AMA Computer College has 41 campuses nationwide under the AMA University and Colleges umbrella. Only the main campus of AMA in Project 8 is accredited with a University status; all else are under study for proper tertiary status. Student population mainly determine the longevity of the campuses.

Member schools
The AMA Education System has a number of member schools.

 AMA Computer College are educational institutions across the Philippines that offer the same programs as AMACU.
 AMA International University is a partnership between the government of Bahrain and AMA Education System serving AMA's ICT programs in the Arab Region.
 AMA Computer Learning Center (ACLC College) offers shorter Information Technology-related programs.
ABE International Business College offers Business Administration, Hotel and Restaurant Management, Tourism, and Information Technology.
 St. Augustine School of Nursing offers short medicine-related programs like caregiving.
 Norwegian Maritime Academy offers maritime-related courses like marine engineering.
 AMA School of Medicine offers medicine-related courses like nursing.
 AMA Basic Education offers basic education programs.
 Delta Air International Aviation Academy offers studies in aviation.

Controversies

School principal case resolution
On 23 January 2007, the Supreme Court affirmed the decision of the NLRC regarding the dismissal of a high school principal.

A high school principal was promoted on 13 May 1996 but an incident four days later led to her dismissal. A cashier at the company, carried a brown envelope containing PhP 47,299.34 to the comfort room of the school. While inside, she placed the envelope on top of the (toilet bowl) tank. After she left the room, she realized the envelope was left behind, hence she returned to the comfort room, but the envelope was already gone. The incident was reported to the area director, who told that the only person she recalled entering the comfort room after her was the school principal. Investigation of the school principal was ordered. Thereafter, she was brought to the barangay office and the incident was entered in its blotter. On 20 May 1996, she was suspended.

School officials served the principal several notices to appear during the hearings and to submit her written explanation, but the hearings were always cancelled. On 19 June 1996, AMA dismissed the principal on the ground of loss of trust and confidence. On 21 June 1996, school officials sent her another notice directing her to appear on 27 June 1996 hearing and to submit a written explanation. The hearing was, again, cancelled. On 1 July 1996, AMA finally terminated her employment.

On 14 August 1996, Garay filed a complaint for her dismissal and on 14 September 1998, NLRC Labor Arbiter Eduardo Carpio rendered judgment. He ruled that there was no material and direct evidence to show that the employee took the collections. NLRC ordered AMA to immediately reinstate her to her former or substantially equal position and pay her backwages computed in the amount of P300,000.00 (1 July 1996 to 31 December 1998 = 30 months. P10,000.00 x 30 months = P300,000.00), moral damages of PhP 100,000.00 and exemplary damages of PhP 50,000.00.

Student case resolution
On 10 November 2004 the Regional Trial Court dismissed the case against 48 students and granted the students' motion to discontinue the proceedings after getting assurance from the school administration that they can continue with their studies. The students were ordered dismissed by school management 4 October 2004 for holding a protest rally in front of the school.

The students were dismissed from the school by the area director, school director and the school's disciplinary board after they held a protest rally in front of the school campus without the necessary permit. They said that the dismissal of the students was based on a resolution dated 9 October issued by Student Disciplinary Tribunal, which states that holding of rallies or any related activities without the necessary permit from an authorized school officer is a major offense that merits dismissal as provided for in the student handbook.

The students filed a 13-page civil suit with damages against the school for dismissing them. They also claimed their dismissal was null and void and violates their freedom of expression as enshrined in the 1987 Philippine Constitution. They said they held the rally to show support for the preventive suspension of several regular teachers, the implementation of the webcast teaching system and other unresolved issues regarding miscellaneous fees.

The students were accompanied by police authorities in going back to school.

Daniel Padilla PBA D-League issue
Daniel Padilla, a local actor, signed as AMA University's fifth advertisement endorser. AMA then joined as an expansion basketball team to the 2014–2015 season of the PBA Developmental League and Padilla was selected by AMA as its final round draft pick. Many spectators in the draft event at the PBA head office in Libis, Quezon City were surprised with the selection as Padilla was not part of the 153 players who submitted their application for the draft. AMA invoked its right as a school-based team to sign a player who hasn't applied for the draft.

Padilla's professional handler, ABS-CBN's Star Magic denied reports Padilla was allowed to join the league and it was done without their prior knowledge. AMA claimed that Padilla was enrolled by the university as a freshman for the course Information Technology. Padilla responded to news reporters and stated that it was much of his surprise that he was drafted without his prior knowledge and declined to join the basketball league.

Notable alumni
 Mujiv Hataman – Governor of Autonomous Region in Muslim Mindanao
 Chito Jaime – PBA Player - San Miguel Beermen
 Getulio Napeñas – former head of the Philippine National Police Special Action Force
 Rainier Castillo – as freshman before joining Starstruck
 Teddy Corpuz – Rocksteddy's vocalist
 Onel de Guzman – computer programmer and hacker
 Jolina Magdangal – actress
 Ryza Cenon – actress, dancer, and model
 Sharlene San Pedro – actress, model, and video streamer

References

 
Educational institutions established in 1980
1980 establishments in the Philippines
Universities and colleges in Quezon City
Schools in Quezon City